The LG enV (pronounced "envy"), also known as the VX9900, is a Bluetooth-enabled and V CAST-ready mobile phone that includes a full "qwerty" keyboard and a 2.0  megapixel camera. It comes in three color variations: silver, orange, and green.

It is succeeded by different phones, each of which have chosen different paths: the LG Voyager, released November 2007, which has a touch sensitive front, enV3, which was released in May 2009, along with the enV touch.

See also
Helio Ocean
LG Rumor (original)
LG The V (VX9800) (predecessor) 
LG Voyager (VX10000)
Danger Hiptop (T-Mobile Sidekick)

References

External links
Verizon Wireless: "enV"
Skatter Tech: "LG enV (VX9900) Review"
LG enV at WikiSpecs 

VX9900
Mobile phones introduced in 2006